Herman Brad Baxter (born May 5, 1967) is a former professional American football running back who played in the National Football League from 1989 to 1995. Drafted by the Minnesota Vikings in the eleventh round of the 1989 NFL Draft, Baxter failed to make the team but caught on with the New York Jets.

After not seeing the field in 1989 Baxter, the team's starting fullback, made his mark in 1990 by rushing for 539 yards on 124 carries in ten starts. Baxter had perhaps his best year as a pro in 1991, as his eleven rushing touchdowns ranked third in the NFL (leading the AFC]] and he rushed for a career high 666 yards as the Jets made the playoffs. His rushing numbers increased in 1992 as he recorded 696 yards and six touchdowns.

After the 1993 season, Baxter's rushing totals began to diminish as he was featured less and less in the offense. He missed the first week of mandatory minicamp in May 1996 due to an incident involving his off-season vocation as a truck driver transporting cattle between Enterprise, Alabama and Amarillo, Texas. During his final haul the day before reporting for the start of camp, he was detained for twelve hours in Augusta, Georgia when United States Department of Transportation inspectors checked his logbook and discovered that he had been on the road too long without a break. He fell out of favor with head coach Rich Kotite and offensive coordinator Ron Erhardt, was replaced by Richie Anderson as the starting fullback and released by the Jets on August 25, 1996.

References

1967 births
Living people
American football running backs
Alabama State Hornets football players
New York Jets players
Sportspeople from Dothan, Alabama
Players of American football from Alabama